This is a list of notable Jewish American physicists. For other Jewish Americans, see Lists of Jewish Americans.

Stephen Brunauer Hungarian physicist who came to United States to study sciences. Inventor of BET theory and porous Portland cement.
 Richard P. Feynman, physicist, Nobel Prize (1965) (though he always refused to appear in lists such as this one and other lists or books that classified people by race)
 Cornelius Lanczos, mathematical physicist
J. Robert Oppenheimer, "the father of the atomic bomb"
Eric Weinstein (born 1965), mathematical physicist
 Victor Frederick Weisskopf (1908–2002), physicist; during World War II, he worked at Los Alamos on the Manhattan Project to develop the atomic bomb, and later campaigned against the proliferation of nuclear weapons

See also
List of members of the National Academy of Sciences
List of National Medal of Science winners

References

Jewish
Physicists
Physicists